Guangfa Securities Headquarters, also known as GF Securities Tower, is a 58-floor,  tall skyscraper in Guangzhou, Guangdong, China. Construction was started in 2013 and was completed in 2018.

It serves as the headquarters of GF Securities.

See also
List of tallest buildings in China
List of tallest buildings in Guangzhou

References

Skyscraper office buildings in Guangzhou
Buildings and structures in Guangzhou

Buildings and structures completed in 2018